Anisoptera aurea is a tree species in the family Dipterocarpaceae. This Asian species has been recorded from: the Philippines (Luzon), peninsular Malaysia (Penang), Sumatra, and Myanmar [Burma] (Taninthayi). No subspecies are listed in the Catalogue of Life.

References

External links 
 * 

Anisoptera (plant)
Flora of Malesia
Plants described in 1938